Pakkiyaselvam Ariyanethiran (born 1 February 1955) is a Sri Lankan Tamil politician and former Member of Parliament.

Early life
Ariyanethiran was born on 1 February 1955.

Political career
Ariyanethiran was trustee of Kokkatticholai Sivan Temple and editor of Thamil Alai (Tamil wave), a Liberation Tigers of Tamil Eelam newspaper. He was selected by the Tamil Tigers as one of the Tamil National Alliance's (TNA) candidates in Batticaloa District at the 2004 parliamentary election but failed to get elected after coming fifth amongst the TNA candidates. However, Ariyanethiran entered Parliament in May 2004 following the resignation of Kingsley Rasanayagam. It has been alleged that the Tamil Tigers abducted and forced Rasanayagam to resign to make way for Ariyanethiran.

Ariyanethiran was re-elected at the 2010 parliamentary election. He failed to get re-elected at the 2015 parliamentary election.

Electoral history

References

Illankai Tamil Arasu Kachchi politicians
Living people
1955 births
Members of the 13th Parliament of Sri Lanka
Members of the 14th Parliament of Sri Lanka
People from Eastern Province, Sri Lanka
Sri Lankan Hindus
Sri Lankan Tamil politicians
Tamil National Alliance politicians